The 2022 Supercopa Uruguaya was the fifth edition of the Supercopa Uruguaya, Uruguay's football super cup. It was held on 30 January 2022 between the 2021 Primera División champions Peñarol and the 2021 Torneo Apertura champions Plaza Colonia.

Originally the match was scheduled to be played at Estadio Silvestre Octavio Landoni in Durazno, however, the Durazno Intendancy declined to host it due to an increase of COVID-19 cases in the Durazno Department. On 21 January 2022, the Uruguayan Football Association (AUF) announced that the match was moved to Estadio Domingo Burgueño in Maldonado.

Peñarol defeated Plaza Colonia by a 1–0 score after extra time to win their second Supercopa Uruguaya title.

Teams
The Supercopa Uruguaya is usually contested by the champions of the Primera División and the Torneo Intermedio winners of the previous year, however, since the Torneo Intermedio was not held in 2021 due to the COVID-19 pandemic, on 21 December 2021 the League Council of the AUF voted that Plaza Colonia, as winners of the 2021 Torneo Apertura, would play the Supercopa against Peñarol.

Nacional, as the team that placed second in the aggregate table of the 2021 Primera División season, was offered to take part in the Supercopa but they declined the nomination.

Details

References

2022 in Uruguayan football
Supercopa Uruguaya
Supercopa Uruguaya 2022